Metanarsia amseli is a moth of the family Gelechiidae. It is found in southern Iran.

The wingspan is about 12 mm. The ground colour of forewings is off-white, with brown-tipped scales arranged in three spots in the central part of the forewing. The hindwings are light-grey. Adults are on wing in early April.

References

Moths described in 2008
Metanarsia